Anepischetosia maccoyi, also known commonly as the  highlands forest-skink, highlands forest skink, Maccoy's elf skink, or McCoy's skink,  is a species of lizard in the family Scincidae.  The species, which is monotypic in the genus Anepischetosia, is endemic to Australia.

Etymology
The specific name, maccoyi, is in honor of Irish zoologist Frederick McCoy.

Taxonomy
The generic name, Anepischetosia, was created by Australian herpetologists Richard W. Wells and C. Ross Wellington in 1985 to replace the generic name, Anepischetos, which was preoccupied by a genus of moths. Anepischetosia is in the subfamily Eugongylinae.

Reproduction
A. maccoyi appears to be ovoviviparous. The Reptile Database describes the species as being oviparous. However, Lucas and Frost, in their original description of the species in 1894, wrote, "Young developed within the body of the parent, eight or nine being brought forth in January or February."

References

Further reading
Cogger HG (2014). Reptiles and Amphibians of Australia, Seventh Edition. Clayton, Victoria, Australia: CSIRO Publishing. xxx + 1,033 pp. .
Lucas AHS, Frost C (1894). "The Lizards indigenous to Victoria". Proceedings of the Royal Society of Victoria [New Series ] 6: 24-92 + Plate II. (Siaphos maccoyi, new species, pp. 85-86 + Plate II, figures 2, 2a).
Wells, Richard W.; Wellington, C. Ross (1985). "A Classification of the Amphibia and Reptilia of Australia". Australian Journal of Herpetology Supplemental Series (1): 1-61. (Anepischetosia, new genus, p. 23).
Wison, Steve; Swan, Gerry (2013). A Complete Guide to Reptiles of Australia, Fourth Edition. Sydney: New Holland Publishers. 522 pp. .

Skinks of Australia
Reptiles described in 1894
Taxa named by Arthur Henry Shakespeare Lucas
Taxa named by Charles Frost (naturalist)